La Petite Reine is a French film production company founded in 1995, led by Thomas Langmann and . The word Reine in the name is a play on words referring to Langmann's father Claude Berri's production company .

Filmography
List of films produced or coproduced by La Petite Reine:

 1996 : 
 2002 : Asterix & Obelix: Mission Cleopatra, Le Boulet
 2004 : Blueberry, l'expérience secrète, 
 2005 : 
 2006 : Those Happy Days
 2007 : 
 2008 : Astérix at the Olympic Games (film), Mesrine: Killer Instinct, Mesrine: Public Enemy Number One
 2010 : 
 2011 : La Nouvelle Guerre des boutons, The Artist
 2012 : The Suicide Shop, Maniac, 
 2013 : 
 2014 : 
 2016 : 
 2019 : Quand on crie au loup

Logo 
The logo represents a girl wearing a crown and a dress with royal fleur-de-lis motifs on it playing with a skipping rope on the surface of a lake at night.

References

Film production companies of France
Film distributors of France
Mass media in Paris
Entertainment companies established in 1995
Mass media companies established in 1995
1995 establishments in France